Cha'ensi Town is an urban town in and subdivision of Xiangtan County, Hunan Province, People's Republic of China.

Administrative division
The town is divided into 30 villages and 1 community, the following areas: Cha'ensi Community, Shangfeng Village, Wujia Village, Huxiang Village, Qingping Village, Xiongshi Village, Fantian Village, Fuqiao Village, Nongzi Village, Shuangyang Village, Zhangshuwan Village, Huafang Village, Shuangjiang Village, Heyue Village, Jinbaochong Village, Chahua Village, Longjing Village, Jinping Village, Shuangfeng Village, Huilong Village, Baitang Village, Xiaohua Village, Huaqian Village, Tanghua Village, Quanping Village, Xingyue Village, Dongshan Village, Xiangheng Village, Qianjia Village, Yangxi Village, and Fuxing Village.

History
The town's name was come from a Buddhism temple "Cha'en Temple", Cha'en Temple was built in Ming Dynasty.

In May 1952, Cha'en Township was built. In June 1956, it was renamed "Cha'ensi Township". In January 1994, Cha'ensi Town was built.

Economy
The region abounds with granite.

Bamboo and Chinese chestnut important to the economy.

Culture
Huaguxi is the most influence local theater.

References

External links

Divisions of Xiangtan County